Chabanmakhi (Dargwa: Чабанмахьи) is a rural locality (a selo) in Karamakhinsky Selsoviet, Buynaksky District, Republic of Dagestan, Russia. The population was 1,083 as of 2010. There are 15 streets.

Geography 
Chabanmakhi is located 30 km southeast of Buynaksk (the district's administrative centre) by road. Durangi is the nearest rural locality.

References 

Rural localities in Buynaksky District